Untitled is an outdoor 1977 stainless steel sculpture by American artist Bruce West, installed in Portland, Oregon, in the United States.

Description

Bruce West's Untitled is installed along Southwest 6th Avenue between Washington and Stark streets in Portland's Transit Mall. It was one of eleven works chosen in 1977 to make the corridor "more people oriented and attractive" as part of the Portland Transit Mall Art Project. It was funded by TriMet and the United States Department of Transportation, and is administered by the Regional Arts & Culture Council.

See also
 1977 in art
 Sculpture Stage (1976), another Portland sculpture by Bruce West

References

External links

 Untitled at the Public Art Archive
 TriMet Max Green Line Public Art Guide (PDF), TriMet

1977 establishments in Oregon
1977 sculptures
Outdoor sculptures in Portland, Oregon
Sculptures on the MAX Green Line
Southwest Portland, Oregon
Stainless steel sculptures in Oregon